The Voisin Canard was an aircraft developed by Voisin brothers during 1910 and first flown early in 1911.  It was named the Canard because of the resemblance of its forward fuselage to that of a duck's long neck while in flight.  It was originally flown as a landplane: with the addition of floats it became one of the first seaplanes used by the French Navy.

Design and development
The Canard was, even by the standards of 1910, a curiously regressive design, its layout reminiscent of Alberto Santos-Dumont's 14-bis of 1906.

As first flown at Issy-les-Moulineaux by Maurice Colliex, the aircraft had an uncovered fuselage of wire-braced wood construction with the  Rossel-Peugeot rotary engine at the rear and the front-mounted control surfaces consisting of an all-moving elevator divided into two halves, one either side of the fuselage, a rectangular balanced rudder mounted above the elevator, and a pair of short-span fixed horizontal surfaces with a high angle of attack mounted behind and below the elevators. Voisin's characteristic side-curtains were fitted to the outermost pair of interplane struts and roll control was achieved using trailing-edge ailerons on both upper and lower wings.

The aircraft was judged a success and Voisin manufactured a number of examples. The number of sets of side curtains varied, some aircraft having two or even three sets.

Seaplane version

The seaplane variant, fitted with floats designed by Henri Fabre, was initially built to the order of Prince Bibesco, who intended to use it make a flight across the Black Sea.  It was first successfully flown from water on 25 April 1911.

One example was bought by the French navy in March 1912 to equip the seaplane tender La Foudre, the first seaplane carrier in history.  A second example was delivered to the Navy in December 1913.

Specifications

Notes

References
 Opdycke, Leonard E.Ŵ  French Aeroplanes Before the Great War  Atglen, PA: Schiffer, 1999

Further reading

External links

Flights of Maurice Colliex on the Canard Voisin
Les Canards de Gabriel Voisin (HTML), PDF file with images

Canard
1910s French experimental aircraft
Single-engined pusher aircraft
Rotary-engined aircraft
Biplanes
Canard aircraft
Aircraft first flown in 1911